Folarin II is the seventh studio album by American rapper Wale released on October 22, 2021, by Every Blue Moon, Maybach Music Group and Warner Records. The production on the album was handled by several producers, including Cool & Dre, DJ Khalil, Harry Fraud, Hitmaka, J.U.S.T.I.C.E. League, Lee Major, OG Parker and Rogét Chahayed among others. The album features guest appearances by Rick Ross, Chris Brown, J. Cole, Jamie Foxx, Ant Clemons, Yella Beezy, Maxo Kream, Chase Young, and Shawn Stockman. The album was executive produced by Ross and Wale. It is the sequel to Wale's 2012 mixtape Folarin.

Folarin II was supported by three singles: "Angles" featuring Chris Brown, "Down South" featuring Yella Beezy and Maxo Kream and "Poke It Out" featuring J. Cole.

Promotion 
The lead single from the album, "Angles" featuring American singer Chris Brown, released on June 18, 2021. The music video for the song was released on June 22, 2021, three days after the single came out. The song was produced by OG Parker, Hitmaka, John $K McGee, and LouXtwo. The song samples "I Need a Girl" by Puff Daddy, Usher and Loon. The song did not enter the Billboard Hot 100 but peaked at number 6 on the Bubbling Under Hot 100 chart. And the song also peaked at number 44 on the Hot R&B/Hip-Hop Songs chart.

The second single from the album, "Down South" featuring American rappers Yella Beezy and Maxo Kream, was released on August 12, 2021. The song's music video was released on October 15, 2021. The song was produced by Harry Fraud. The song sampled "Stay Tippin" by Mike Jones, Paul Wall and Slim Thug.

The third and final single from the album, "Poke It Out" featuring American rapper J. Cole, was released on September 30, 2021. The music video for the song was premiered on October 4, 2021, three days after the single was released. The song was produced by Cool & Dre. The song samples "Vivrant Thing" by Q-Tip. The song debuted at number 73 on the Billboard Hot 100. Also, the song debuted at number 21 on the Hot R&B/Hip-Hop Songs and at number 12 on the Hot Rap Songs charts.

The music video for the song, "Tiffany Nikes", premiered on March 1, 2022.

Critical reception

Commercial performance 
Folarin II debuted at number 22 on the US Billboard 200, earning 20,000 album-equivalent units (including 2,900 pure album sales) in its first week. The album also peaked at number twelve on the US Top R&B/Hip-Hop Albums and at number eleven on the US Top Rap Albums charts, which marks both Wale's seventh entry on the charts.

Track listing 
Credits were adapted from Genius, Spotify and Tidal.

Notes 
  signifies a co-producer
  signifies an additional producer
  signifies an uncredited producer

Sample credits 
 "Name Ring Bell" contains samples from "Ting-A-Ling", written by Rexton Gordan, Wycliffe Johnson and Cleveland Browne, and performed by Shabba Ranks; and an interpolation from "Make It Hot", written by Melissa Elliot, Tim Mosley and A. Richards, and performed by Nicole Wray.
 "Poke It Out" contains samples from "Vivrant Thing", written by Jonathan Davis, James Yancey and Barry Carter, and performed by Q-Tip.
 "Tiffany Nikes" contains samples from "Amazing", written by George Michael and Johnny Douglas, and performed by George Michael.
 "Caramel" contains samples from "Caramel Kisses", written by Faith Evans, Sean Combs, Chucky Thompson, Michael Keith and Quinnes Parker, and performed by Faith Evans featuring 112.
 "Angles" contains samples from "I Need a Girl (Part One)", written by Sean Combs, Usher Raymond and Chauncey Hawkins, and performed by P. Diddy featuring Usher and Loon.
 "Dearly Beloved" contains an excerpt and a sample from the episode, "Always Follow Your Heart", from The Jamie Foxx Show.
 "Down South" contains samples from "Still Tippin'", written by Michael Jones, Paul Slayton, Stayve Thomas and Salih Williams, performed by Mike Jones featuring Paul Wall and Slim Thug; and an interpolation from "Slangin'", written by Richard Jones, Chad Butler, Bernard Freeman and Percy Miller Sr., performed by Fiend featuring UGK and Master P.
 "Fire & Ice" contains samples from "This Day, This Minute, Right Now", written and performed by Mint Condition.

Charts

References

2021 albums
Wale (rapper) albums
Albums produced by Cool & Dre
Albums produced by Harry Fraud
Albums produced by J.U.S.T.I.C.E. League
Albums produced by DJ Khalil
Sequel albums
Maybach Music Group albums
Warner Records albums